Jacob of Ancona (or Jacob d'Ancona) is the name that has been given to the supposed author of a book of travels, purportedly made by a scholarly Jewish merchant who wrote in vernacular Italian, an account of a trading venture he made, in which he reached China in 1271, four years before Marco Polo.  The narrative contains political debates about the future of the city in which he engaged with the aid of a translator of mixed Italian and Chinese ancestry.

Missing manuscript
The Italian manuscript from which David Selbourne, an  Englishman residing in Italy, professed to have made his translation, published as The City of Light: The Hidden Journal of the Man Who Entered China Four Years Before Marco Polo, has not come to light, even in photocopies; its possessor still remains anonymous. Selbourne asserts that "provenance and rights of ownership over it are unclear," motivating its owner's desire for anonymity.

Doubts
In 1997, Little, Brown and Company was prepared to publish the diary, under the title The City of Light in the United States. The house had just published the book in the UK when word spread that China scholar Jonathan Spence, the Sterling Professor of History at Yale, had written a book review for The New York Times that questioned the book's authenticity. Despite growing pressure, David Selbourne has continued to refuse to make the original manuscript available for public scrutiny. At the last minute,  in September 1997, Little, Brown and Co. pulled the diary from US publication, scheduled for 3 November.

T. H. Barrett, School of Oriental and African Studies, in The London Review of Books, 30 October 1997, described the text as a forgery; he noted that the garbled name Baiciu for a famous rebel "was only known to the narrator of the account in a form which derived from an 18th-century misreading of an Arabic manuscript— as good a proof as any that something is badly amiss." Roz Kaveny, reviewing the book in New Statesman noted that "By coincidence, much of what Jacob d'Ancona dislikes in 13th-century China is what David Selbourne dislikes in late-20th century Britain" and thought that she recognized in the dialectical principles with which d'Ancona controverts his ideological opponents close parallels with Selbourne's own rhetorical techniques. She concluded that one might prefer "to suppose that the dilemma, and the document, are mirages, that his book is a postmodernist literary device."

In December 2007 a University of London professor read a public lecture "The Faking of 'The City of Light'". Bernard Wasserstein, president of the Oxford Center for Hebrew and Jewish Studies, and his brother, David, professor of Islamic history at Tel Aviv University publicly called attention to an anachronism, Jacob's arrival at a mellah in the Persian Gulf, a descriptive for a ghetto based on the root for "salt", that was not used until the 15th century, in Morocco.

The first writer to come forward to support the text's authenticity in public was journalist Melanie Phillips, who took issue with Barrett in the Sunday Times, 8 October 1998, and who responded, as did Selbourne, to Barrett's letter to LRB Selbourne further responded with a "Preface to the American Edition" (Lightning Source, 2003) when the Kensington imprint Citadel Press published The City of Light: the Hidden Journal of the Man Who Entered China Four Years Before Marco Polo in 2000. A Chinese translation was published in Shanghai, December 1999, under the direction of Prof. Li Xue Qin, Academy of Social Sciences, Selbourne reported.

Notes

See also
 Chronology of European exploration of Asia
 European exploration of Arabia
 Timeline of European exploration

References
Natalie Danford, "The Chinese discovered America!" Assessing 1421.
London Review of Books 21.1, 7 January 1999: Correspondence

Further reading
Halkin, Hillel, "The Strange Adventures of Jacob d'Ancona: Is a memoir of China purportedly written by a 13th-century Jewish merchant authentic? And if not, what then?" in Commentary Magazine, 111.4 (April 2001)

13th-century Italian writers
13th-century Italian Jews
Explorers of Asia
Italian expatriates in China
Italian explorers
Italian merchants
Italian scholars
Jewish Chinese history
Jewish explorers
Jewish Italian writers
Medieval Jewish scholars
Medieval Jewish travel writers
Medieval Italian merchants
13th-century Italian businesspeople
13th-century travelers